Venkarai is a panchayat town of Paramathi Velur taluk, Namakkal district in the Indian state of Tamil Nadu.

Demographics
In the 2001 India census, Venkarai had a population of 13,447. Males constituted 50% of the population and females 50%. Venkarai had an average literacy rate of 66%, higher than the national average of 59.5%: male literacy was 75%, and female literacy 56%. In Venkarai, 9% of the population were under 6 years of age.

References

Cities and towns in Namakkal district